The R492 is a regional road in County Offaly linking Shinrone to the N62 at Sharavogue between Roscrea and Birr.

The road traverses two bridges listed as being of architectural and technical interest. The first is Sharavogue Bridge which carries the road over the Little Brosna River and the second, a single arched bridge  over the now disused Roscrea and Parsonstown Railway line.

See also
 Roads in Ireland - (Primary National Roads)
 Secondary Roads
 Regional Roads

References

Regional roads in the Republic of Ireland
Roads in County Offaly